J-Game is the seventh studio album by Taiwanese singer Jolin Tsai. It was released on April 25, 2005, by Sony BMG. Produced by Jamie Hsueh, Jack Chou, Bing Wang, and Adia, it incorporated genres of pop, hip-hop, electronic, old school, disco, and Chinese style.

It received mixed reviews from music critics, who commented that it for being trendy and pursuing perfection, but also for being vague positioning and lacking in personality. It sold more than 1.2 million copies in Asia. In Taiwan, it sold more than 260,000 copies, becoming the year's highest-selling album by a female artist and the year's second highest-selling album overall.

Background and release 
On February 27, 2004, Tsai released her sixth studio album, Castle, which sold more than 1.5 million copies in Asia. In Taiwan, it sold more than 300,000 copies, becoming the year's highest-selling album by a female artist and the year's second highest-selling album overall. On August 7, 2004, she embarked on her first concert tour J1 World Tour at the Hongkou Football Stadium in Shanghai, China.

On January 23, 2005, she revealed that her new album would be released in April 2005, and she said: "I have recorded three songs, and there are also lyrics that I wrote, some works are still looking for melodies, it will be settled down before Chinese New Year in the year." On March 31, 2005, it was revealed that "J-Game" would become the lead single of the album, and it was revealed that the second single would be a ballad. On April 8, 2005, it was revealed that Wang Leehom had written a song for the album, Tsai said: "There are more than hundred of songs being collected, and the ones that remain on the album are the best songs!"

Writing and recording 

"J-Game" incorporated elements including hip-hop, old school, disco, etc. The dynamic rhythm and catchy melody show Tsai's kind and firm self-attitude. The "tiger" and "mouse" in the lyrics represent different roles that people play in their lives unknowingly, Tsai said: "When I first got this song, I was a little surprised by the lovely lyrics of 'tiger' and 'mouse', and I didn't know how to sing it best. However, if you look at the whole song carefully, you will find that the ultimate expression is that life is like a savage game, everyone is in the 'jungle' to find their own way to survive, so you should be brave to try anything." "Sky" evolves from a progressive piano into a pulsating movement, and her rich and calm voice mood is also very touching. "Overlooking Purposely" has a dynamic melody and a clear rhythm, and the lyrics describe the tricks of love.

The lyrics of "Greek Girl by the Wishing Pond" describe the girl's first love, and the melody incorporated the harmony of innocent children. "Exclusive Myth" combined chinked-out and Chinese musical instruments, and she used a soft and delicate voice to portray a new century's love story. The lyrics of "Repeated Note" was written by Tsai, and they compare love to the musical symbols. "Missing You" describes the wonderful taste of love and the feeling of a throbbing heart. The crisp guitar sound and bright interlude show a variety of sweet and sour tastes in love. In "Oh Oh," she used a playful voice to sing the secret words among girls. In "Hunting Cupid", her gentle and strong singing voice is paired with the heavy beat rock melody, which shows the full vitality and determination of girls to defend their love.

Title and artwork 
The album takes the concept of 'game' as the starting point, and it was divided into three themes—"Jisco-Game", "Jissing-Game", and "Jancy-Game", which these three represent the three musical styles of the album, namely "dynamic dance music", "moderate love song", and "fantasy world", and Tsai said she wanted to show creative and adventurous attitude towards life through the album.

Tsai wore a blue dress on the cover of the album's pre-order gift, and it was used the computer technology to create a collage of cuts by adding stars and flowers to the end of the dress. She wore a white T-shirt and jeans on the cover of the album's standard edition, while she wore a punk calfskin off-the-shoulder top and miniskirt on the cover of the album's champion celebration edition, with accessories on her arms and waist showing a full mature femininity.

Release and promotion 
On April 11, 2005, Sony BMG announced that the album would be available for pre-order on April 15, 2005, and it was revealed that the pre-order gift would include a behind-the-scenes video of the music video of "J-Game". On April 16, 2005, Tsai held an album premiere in Taipei, Taiwan. On April 21, 2005, it was revealed that the album had been pre-ordered for more than 60,000 copies in Taiwan within the first three days. On April 25, 2005, Tsai held a press conference in Taipei, Taiwan and announced that the album had been pre-ordered for more than 150,000 copies in Taiwan within the first ten days. In its first week of release, it topped the weekly album sales charts of G-Music, Asia Records, and Five Music in Taiwan. On May 27, 2005, G-Music announced that it topped their weekly album sales chart for five consecutive weeks.

On June 1, 2005, Tsai held an album celebration event in Taipei, Taiwan, and she announced that the total sales in Asia exceeded 1 million copies. On June 9, 2005, Asia Records announced that it topped the weekly album sales chart for five consecutive weeks. On June 18, 2005, she held the Exclusive Asia Concert in Taichung, Taiwan. On July 8, 2005, the label released the deluxe edition of the album, which additionally includes ten music videos. On July 31, 2005, the label announced that the album had sold more than 1.2 million copies in Asia. On December 21, 2005, it was revealed that Tsai and Sony BMG's contractual relationship had actually ended as early as February 2005, but in return for the label's kindness to her, Tsai still actively cooperated with the album's promotion without a contract. The album reached number two and number four on the year-end album sales charts of G-Music and Five Music of 2015, respectively.

Live performances 

On July 24, 2005, Tsai attended the 7th CCTV-MTV Music Awards and sang "J-Game". On July 31, 2005, she attended the TVB Jade television show Jade Solid Gold, where she sang "J-Game" and "Sky". On August 5, 2005, she attended the 2005 Metro Radio Mandarin Hits Music Awards and sang "Sky" and "J-Game". On August 20, 2005, she attended the 2005 Taipei Pop Music Festival and sang "Overlooking Purposely" and "J-Game". On September 3, 2005, she attended the 5th Global Chinese Music Awards and sang "J-Game". On October 19, 2005, she attended the opening party of the 7th Nanning International Folk Song Arts Festival and sang "J-Game". On October 25, 2005, she attended the China Online Music Festival Concert and sang "J-Game".

On December 31, 2005, she attended the New Year's Eve Concert in Kaohsiung, Taiwan and sang "J-Game", "Sky", and "Overlooking Purposely". On January 11, 2006, she attended the 12th China Music Awards and sang "J-Game". On January 21, 2006, she attended the 2006 Hito Music Awards and sang "Sky" and "J-Game". On February 22, 2006, she attended the recording of the TVB Jade television show Jade Solid Gold and sang "J-Game". On February 26, 2006, she attended the 2006 TVBS Music Awards and sang "Greek Girl by the Wishing Pond" and "Sky". Since then, Tsai has been performing songs from the album at various events.

Singles and music videos 

On April 13, 2005, Tsai released the single, "J-Game". The music video of the song was co-directed by Marlboro Lai and Bill Chia, it cost a total of NT$1.5 million, and the computer technology was used to create the animation effect of flowers sea scene, and the helicopter in the music video worth NT$30 million was designed by Ferrari's designer and took Tsai between the "real world" and the "virtual world". The pink dress in the music video is a ballet-inspired design by Rei Kawakubo.

The music video of "Sky" was directed by JP Huang and was filmed at Qingtiangang Grassland in Yangmingshan National Park in Taipei, Taiwan. The music video of "Exclusive Myth" was directed by Kuang Sheng, and it cost a total of NT$150. The music video is based on the concept of dialogue with past life using the ouija board. Meanwhile, it was also set up scenes of alleys and arches which are full of strong Chinese classic style, and the film art team was invited to produce the animation effects in the style of ink wash painting. The song's composer Wang Leehom also gave ideas for the music video, including the Chinese style layout, erhu, guzheng, smoke effect, and slow motion technique. The music video of "Overlooking Purposely" was directed by Kuang Sheng, the music video of "Greek Girl by the Wishing Pond" was co-directed by Marlboro Lai and Bill Chia, and both music videos of "Repeated Note" and "Sweet and Sour" were directed by Marlboro Lai. "J-Game" reached number 26 on the Hit FM Top 100 Singles of the Year chart of 2005, where "Sky" and "Overlooking Purposely" reached number two and 65, respectively.

Critical reception 
The Chinese Musicians Exchange Association commented: "Nowadays the direction of making records is heavy and complicated, their commercial approach is making songs sound extreme, popular, and avant-garde. This album is at the pinnacle of bubblegum music, this development direction suits her very well, I really admire the way in which the album production follows the trend and achieves the ultimate. There is surprise, I want to listen to it for a second time, but she can focus more on her vocal range." Music critic Yang Liay Teing commented: "In J-Game, she collaborated with another talent Wang Leehom. She also played a lot in the musical styles on the album, which continued to consolidate her status as the "Queen of Dance-Pop". Guangzhou Radio's DJ Liang Yucong commented: "I think it sounds more international and more diverse than her previous music, and it also feels mature and a little feminine. In addition to bringing hip-hop music to the album, Wang Leehom also gave the album a promotional topic, I haven't found any obvious weakness for the time being, I feel that her singing skills have improved." Ai FM's DJ PM Wang commented: "Dance-pop again, Jolin's success is to penetrate her own characteristics in the current dance-pop music." Wa! FM's DJ Xi Fei commented: "Given the overall performance of the album, Jolin's J-Game seems to be slightly weaker than her previous album, you need to listen to the songs several times before they leave an impression, the album lacks an impressive song, but it's more delicate, I have to praise Jolin's efforts and progress. In each album, Jolin's personal performance has made obvious improvement. I think that is the reason why she can become a long-lived superstar, Jolin is definitely worth supporting!"

Tencent Entertainment's Shuwa commented: "The overall production style of J-Game is still the same as her previous two records. This time it's more electronic in the style of the dance songs. In terms of local songwriters, in addition to Jamie Hsueh, who has cooperated with her all the time, the works of Ivana Wong and Wesley Chia also made people feel the different Jolin Tsai from before. As for the producers, Jamie Hsueh's production accounts for most of the works, although the first-time collaboration with Wang Leehom was fresh, but it didn't have as much repercussions as the previous cooperation with Jay Chou, also Adia appears in Jolin Tsai's producer list for the first time, but unfortunately the moderate "Sky" did not spark a later collaboration." NetEase Entertainment commented: "Musically, this album can be described as exquisite but mediocre, in other words, although each song sounds a copy of song from her previous two successful albums, although each song was exquisitely crafted, but it lacks the finishing touch of a talented person." Guangdong Radio's DJ Zhou Bin commented: "Strictly speaking, it can only be no failure, although there is no Jay Chou, but it did not affect the quality of the whole record, it's a continuation of her old style, which is still popular among young fans, however, her weakness is that the sense of melody in her several albums is still relatively poor, it will be problematic in the long run." He Yajia of New Express Daily commented: "The new album integrated hip-hop, electronic, old school, and disco, creating a so-called unique 'Jisco', but such unsuccessful change made the album seem disorganized, lack of clear positioning and personality. The music is stronger and faster, the effort to erase Jay Chou's brand in detail hardly seems to realistically highlight Jolin Tsai, every producer has their own strength, after collection of various popular elements, instead, where Jolin Tsai went became a question."

Accolades 
On July 24, 2005, Tsai won a CCTV-MTV Music Award for Best Female Singer (Taiwan）. On August 5, 2005, Tsai won Metro Radio Mandarin Hits Music Awards for Best Asian Singer and Best Stage Performance, "J-Game" won Song of the Year and Top Songs, and "Sky" won Top Songs. On September 3, 2005, Tsai won Global Chinese Music Awards for Favorite Female Singer and Best Stage Performance. On October 30, 2005, "J-Game" won a South-East Music Chart Award for Top 10 Songs (Taiwan). On November 5, 2005, Tsai won a Singapore Hit Award for Best Chart Performance. On December 15, 2005, Tsai won a China Gold Record Award for Best Female Singer (Imported). 

On January 11, 2006, Tsai won a China Music Award for Favorite Female Singer (Hong Kong/Taiwan), and "Sky" won Top Songs. On January 21, 2006, Tsai won Hito Music Awards for Best Female Singer and Most Chart Entries Singer, the album won Most Weeks at Number One Album, and "Sky" won Top 10 Songs. On January 23, 2006, Tsai won a Top Ten Chinese Gold Songs Award for Favorite Female Singer (copper). On February 17, 2006, Tsai won a KKBox Music Award for Top Female Singer, the album won Top 10 Albums, "Overlooking Purposely" won Top 10 Songs, and "Sky" won Top 10 Karaoke Songs. On February 26, 2006, Tsai won a TVBS Music Award for Best Female Singer, and the album won Top 10 Albums. On March 1, 2006, Tsai was nominated an MTV Asia Award for Favorite Artist Taiwan. On April 24, 2006, Tsai won Music Radio China Top Chart Awards for Best Female Singer (Hong Kong/Taiwan), Best Stage Performance, and DJ Favorite Artist. On May 20, 2006, Tsai won a Music King Award for Favorite Female Singer (Taiwan), and "J-Game" won Top 10 Songs (Mandarin).

Track listing

Release history

References

External links 
 
 

2005 albums
Jolin Tsai albums
Sony Music Taiwan albums